George Baird Hodge (April 8, 1828 – August 1, 1892) was an attorney, Confederate politician, colonel and acting general from the Commonwealth of Kentucky. He commanded a cavalry brigade at various times and was paroled as a brigadier general at the end of the war but his appointment as a brigadier general by Confederate President Jefferson Davis was rejected twice by the Confederate States Senate.

Early life
Hodge was born in Fleming County, Kentucky, to William and Sarah (Baird) Hodge.  He received an appointment to the United States Naval Academy at Annapolis, Maryland, and graduated as a midshipman, December 16, 1845.  Hodge was later promoted to acting lieutenant, but eventually resigned his commission January 28, 1850.  Hodge married Keturah Moss Tibbatts, daughter of Colonel John Wooleston Tibbatts.  They had seven children: S. Catherine Taylor (c.1853-1886), Anna Taylor (1854–1923), Jane "Nan"/"Nannie" (1855–1856), Mary (1856–1869), William Baird (1857–1873), Georgena Baird (1859–1927), and John T. (1864–1934).

Politics
Hodge unsuccessfully ran for the United States House of Representatives in 1852. He was later admitted to the bar in Newport, Kentucky, where he practiced law for several years.  In 1859, Hodge was elected to the Kentucky House of Representatives as a Democrat. The following year he served as an elector for the Breckinridge ticket.

Civil War

Hodge enlisted in the Confederate Army as a private in 1861.  Soon thereafter, he was chosen to represent Kentucky in the Provisional Confederate Congress from 1861 to 1862.  When Hodge was not present in Richmond, Virginia, he was promoted to captain and assistant adjutant general in Breckinridge's First Kentucky Brigade. Hodge received a promotion to major May 6, 1862, for gallantry at the Battle of Shiloh and served as a cavalry brigade commander under Joseph Wheeler and Nathan Bedford Forrest. Wheeler commended Hodge for his service during the Middle Tennessee Raid. Forrest, however, relieved Hodge of his command, charging him with incompetence and cowardice. Hodge was acquitted of the charges and later reinstated to field command. He was promoted to colonel May 6, 1863, and briefly served as inspector-general at Cumberland Gap.

Hodge represented Kentucky in the House of Representatives of the First Confederate Congress from February 18, 1862, to February 17, 1864.  After his term expired, he was promoted to colonel and inspector-general and assigned command of the District of Southwest Mississippi and East Louisiana, a post he held until the end of the war.  Hodge was promoted acting brigadier general November 20, 1863, but the promotion was rejected by the Confederate Senate.  The promotion was resubmitted August 2, 1864, and, again, went unconfirmed.  Although he was paroled as a brigadier general and Warner lists him as a Confederate general, Eicher shows him as unconfirmed at that grade and does not list him as a general.

Later life
After the Civil War, Hodge returned to his law practice in Newport. He remained active in politics and served as an elector for the Greeley ticket in 1872. Hodge was elected to the Kentucky Senate and served 1873 to 1877. He also became an orange grower and spent the last years of his life in Florida.

He died August 1, 1892, in Longwood, Florida, and was interred in Seminole, Florida.  His remains were moved to Evergreen Cemetery, Southgate, Kentucky, in 1903.

Publication
 Sketch of the First Kentucky Brigade (Frankfort, KY:  Printed at the Kentucky Yeoman Office, Major & Johnston), 1874.

See also

 List of American Civil War generals (Acting Confederate)
 Kentucky in the Civil War

Notes

References
 Allardice, Bruce S. Confederate Colonels: A Biographical Register. Columbia: University of Missouri Press, 2008. .
 Allardice, Bruce S. More Generals in Gray. Baton Rouge: Louisiana State University Press, 1995. .
 Eicher, John H., and David J. Eicher, Civil War High Commands. Stanford: Stanford University Press, 2001. .
 Warner, Ezra J. Generals in Gray: Lives of the Confederate Commanders. Baton Rouge: Louisiana State University Press, 1959. .

External links
 
 
The Political Graveyard

1828 births
1892 deaths
United States Naval Academy alumni
People of Kentucky in the American Civil War
Confederate States Army generals
Deputies and delegates to the Provisional Congress of the Confederate States
Kentucky state senators
Members of the Confederate House of Representatives from Kentucky
19th-century American politicians
Members of the Kentucky House of Representatives
People from Fleming County, Kentucky
People from Newport, Kentucky
Orphan Brigade
Kentucky lawyers
People from Longwood, Florida
19th-century American lawyers